Tokapal  is a village near Jagdalpur in the Bastar district of Chhattisgarh state of India.

References

Villages in Bastar district